Manshad (also Romanized as Manshād; also known as Darreh) is a village in Miankuh Rural District of the Central District of Mehriz County, Yazd province, Iran. At the 2006 National Census, its population was 430 in 204 households. The following census in 2011 counted 330 people in 161 households. The latest census in 2016 showed a population of 345 people in 176 households; it was the largest village in its rural district.

References 

Mehriz County

Populated places in Yazd Province

Populated places in Mehriz County